Vynohrad is a name for several places in Ukraine:

 Vynohrad, Cherkasy Oblast, a village of Cherkasy Oblast
 Vynohrad, Otynia settlement hromada, Kolomyia Raion, Ivano-Frankivsk Oblast, a village of Kolomyia Raion (Ivano-Frankivsk Oblast)
 Vynohrad, Horodenka urban hromada, Kolomyia Raion, Ivano-Frankivsk Oblast, a village of Kolomyia Raion (Ivano-Frankivsk Oblast)
 Vynohrad, Chernivtsi Oblast, a village of Vyzhnytsia Raion (Chernivtsi Oblast)

See also 
 Vinograd (disambiguation)